The 1895 Vanderbilt Commodores football team represented Vanderbilt University during the 1895 Southern Intercollegiate Athletic Association football season was a member of the Southern Intercollegiate Athletic Association (SIAA).  The team's head coach was Charles L. Upton, who only coached one season in that capacity, at Vanderbilt for one year.

Schedule

References

Vanderbilt
Vanderbilt Commodores football seasons
Vanderbilt Commodores football